Giorgos Malekkides (born 14 July 1997) is a Cypriot football player who plays for Apollon Limassol.

Club career
He made his Cypriot First Division debut for Aris Limassol on 19 December 2015 in a game against Ermis Aradippou.

References

External links
 

1997 births
Living people
Cypriot footballers
Cyprus youth international footballers
Cyprus under-21 international footballers
Aris Limassol FC players
Enosis Neon Parekklisia FC players
Cypriot First Division players
Cypriot Second Division players
Association football defenders